José Armando de Ramón Folch  (February 6, 1927 - February 29, 2004) was a Chilean historian mostly known for his study of urban history. In 1954 de Ramón joined the newly founded Instituto de Investigacions Históricas of the Pontifical Catholic University of Chile led by Jaime Eyzaguirre. He was part of the editorial committee of the journal Historia since it was established in 1961. In 1998 he was awarded the Chilean National History Award.

References

1927 births
2004 deaths
People from Santiago
University of Chile alumni
Academic staff of the Pontifical Catholic University of Chile
20th-century Chilean historians
20th-century Chilean male writers
21st-century Chilean historians
21st-century Chilean male writers
Urban planning in Chile
Chilean architectural historians